Mike Bernard (né Michael Barnet Brown; March 17, 1875 – June 27, 1936) was an American musician who influenced the development of ragtime-era music.

Career 
A musical child prodigy born in New York City, Michael Barnet Brown was the son of decorator and wallpaper dealer Julius S. Brown and his wife Eva Eisenberg. He had one older brother, Harry, born in 1873. Michael studied at the Berlin Conservatory and once reportedly played before the Kaiser.  At age twenty-one, back in New York, he heard Ben Harney (the self-proclaimed "inventor of ragtime") perform, and decided to compete against him.  He soon became known as one of the best ragtime performers in the country, billing himself as the "Rag Time King of the World."  A white musician with little exposure to the African-American roots of ragtime, he pioneered a style of music that appealed to the public but is often derided by purists as "pseudo-ragtime."  He was one of the first to record ragtime piano styles, working for Columbia Records starting in 1912.

While he played in vaudeville pretty much continuously from the late 1890s through the late 1910s, his style mostly fell out of favor by the onset of the jazz age. He was considered for a spot with the Original Dixieland Jazz Band in 1918 after pianist Henry Ragas died in the Spanish influenza outbreak, but the job ended up going to J. Russell Robinson. Mike still managed to work in increasingly smaller venues through the 1920s, last performing at Bill's Gay Nineties in Manhattan just weeks before his death.

His style, flashy and fast, influenced the white ragtime composers of Tin Pan Alley but was often looked down upon by the admirers of the "genuine ragtime" that issued from African-American communities.  Artists considered part of the "Mike Bernard school" include Pete Wendling, Lee S. Roberts, Max Kortlander, Frank Banta, Victor Arden, Phil Ohman, Zez Confrey, Charley Straight, and Roy Bargy.

Awards 
Tony Paster's Theatre (sponsor)
 January 23, 1900: Winner, Ragtime Piano Contest, Tammany Hall
 January 30, 1906: Winner, Ragtime Piano Contest
 Judges: Charlie Horwitz, Harry Von Tilzer, Gus Edwards

Selected discography 
Mike Bernard (solo piano)

 Columbia A-1266
 38467-1 (matrix) — "Everybody two-step", by Wallie Herzer; 
 Reissues (i) Vintage Jazz Mart (Europe) VLP2 & (ii) Smithsonian Folkways RF24
 Recorded in New York City December 2, 1912

 38466 (matrix) — "Battle of San Juan Hill", composed by Mike Bernard; 
 Recorded in New York City, probably December 2, 1912

 Columbia A-1276; 
 38465-1 (matrix) — "Fantasy on Pilgrims' Chorus from Tannhauser", "Finale to Rubinstein's E Flat Concerto"; 
 Recorded in New York City December 2, 1912

 38474-1 (matrix) — "Fantasy On Mendelssohn's Spring Song", "Rubinstein's Melody In F"; 
 Recorded in New York City December 4, 1912

 Columbia A-1313
 38472-1 (matrix) — "That Peculiar Rag", by Barney Fagan; 
 Recorded in New York City December 3, 1912

 38478 (matrix) —  "Medley Of Ted Snyder's Hits"; 
 Intro to "My Sweet Italian", by Irving Berlin
 "When The Midnight Choo-Choo Leaves for Albam' ", by Irving Berlin
 "Ragtime Soldier Man", by Irving Berlin
 Recorded in New York City, December 4, 1912

 Columbia A-1427
 Side A: 38829-2 (matrix) — "Maori", A Samoan dance; 
 Recorded in New York City, May 8, 1913
 Reissues (i) Timeless Records (Netherlands) CBC1-035 (CD)

 Side B: 38927-1 (matrix) — "1915 Rag", by Harry Tierney; 
 Recorded in New York City, June 27, 1913
 Reissues (i) Smithsonian Folkways RF33 (ii) Timeless Records (Netherlands) CBC1-035  (CD)

 Columbia A-1386
 38925 (matrix) — "Medley of Berlin Songs"
 Recorded in New York City June 27, 1913

 38928-1 (matrix) — "Tantalizing Tingles", by Sol Violinsky & Mike Bernard
 Reissues (i) Smithsonian Folkways RF23, Vintage Jazz Mart (Europe) VLP2
 Recorded in New York City June 27, 1913

 Columbia A-1590
 Side A: 38475 (matrix) — "A Trip Across The Pond — Introducing Old Irish And Scotch Airs"; 

 Side B: 38828 (matrix) — "Tango Bonita", by Maurice Smith; 

 Columbia A-2577
 77780-1 (matrix) — "Blaze Away"; 
 Recorded in New York City April 25, 1918
 Reissues (i) Smithsonian Folkways RF23, Timeless Records (Netherlands) CBC1-035

 77783 (matrix) — "When Alexander Takes His Ragtime Band To France", "Some One Else May Be There While I'm Gone"; 

 77783-3 (matrix) — "They Were All Out of Step But Jim", by Irving Berlin
 Recorded in New York City April 25, 1918

Personal
Married three times, he had three sons, one out of wedlock with Ziegfeld Follies girl Dorothy Zuckerman. He also had an intimate relationship with singer Blossom Seeley around 1908 to 1909.  Bernard and his first wife, May Convery — with whom there are two marriage certificates in Manhattan: February 25, 1897, and June 7, 1898 —  had a son, Melvin Bernard (musician; born 1899).  Bertram M. Bernard (lawyer; 1914–1988) was born to Dorothy Zuckerman, but there is no evidence of any marriage to Michael. Julius "Jules" Brown Bernard was born to his third wife, Katherine "Kitty" Stapleton, on October 9, 1921. One other wife, Florence Courtney of the Courtney Sisters, divorced Mike in 1916 after just over two years of marriage, as he was discovered with another female companion, and they were sharing a single pair of pajamas.

Notes

References

1875 births
1936 deaths
American jazz musicians
American ragtime musicians